Joe Dassin (commonly called Les Champs-Élysées after its most famous track) is the third studio album by French musician Joe Dassin. It was originally released in 1969 on the CBS Disques label.

Commercial performance 
The album reached at least the top 10 in France (according to the chart that U.S. Billboard published in its "Hits of the World" section).

Track listing

Notes 
The song Mon village du bout du monde is a French cover of a traditional Irish song Carrickfergus.

References

External links 
 10 Essential Paris albums — Treble
 

1969 albums
Joe Dassin albums
CBS Disques albums

Albums produced by Jacques Plait